Colvile is a surname. Notable persons with that surname include:

Andrew Wedderburn Colvile (also spelled Colville), governor of the Hudson's Bay Company
Charles Robert Colvile (1815–1886), British MP
Eden Colvile (1819–1893), governor of the Hudson's Bay Company
James William Colvile, (1810–1880), British judge
Oliver Colvile (born 1959), British MP